The Grafton Inn is a historic inn at 25 Grafton Common in Grafton, Massachusetts.  The three story wood and brick building was built in 1805 by Samuel Wood, with a design influenced by the work of Charles Bulfinch.  The building was significantly enlarged c. 1865–75, doubling its size and adding the Italianate front porch.  It is a wood-frame structure, with brick ends, a hip roof, and cupola-like belvedere.

The inn was listed on the National Register of Historic Places in 1980, and was included in the Grafton Common Historic District in 1988.  It is still in operation as a restaurant, bar, and seven-room inn.

See also
National Register of Historic Places listings in Worcester County, Massachusetts

References

External links

The Grafton Inn

Hotel buildings on the National Register of Historic Places in Massachusetts
Buildings and structures in Worcester County, Massachusetts
Grafton, Massachusetts
National Register of Historic Places in Worcester County, Massachusetts
Historic district contributing properties in Massachusetts